Garcia is a Spanish municipality in the Catalan comarca of Ribera d'Ebre, whose territory extends over both sides of the Ebre river.

History and archaeology

Garcia has been a site of human occupation at least since ancient Iberian times.

The area was reconquered from the Moors in 1153, by count Ramon Berenguer IV of Barcelona. In medieval times the town was part of the Barony of Entença.

According to an 1156 document by which Ramon Berenguer IV ceded the territory to the Poblet Monastery, Garcia was linked to neighboring El Molar town. This situation ended in the 19th century.

Economy

Traditionally, the predominant activity has always been agriculture. On the irrigated land, vegetables and fruit trees are grown, while on the unirrigated terrain, vines, hazelnuts and olives are cultivated. Pigs and chickens are also reared.

References

External links

Garcia Town Hall webpage
 Government data pages 

Municipalities in Ribera d'Ebre
Populated places in Ribera d'Ebre